Chahar Afshar-e Sofla (also Romanized as Chahār Afshār-e Soflá) is a village in Kakavand-e Sharqi Rural District, Kakavand District, Delfan County, Lorestan Province, Iran. At the 2006 census, its population was 164, in 37 families.

References 

Towns and villages in Delfan County